Upper Red Lake is an unorganized territory in Beltrami County, Minnesota, U.S. It is a part of the Red Lake Indian Reservation. The population was 25 at the 2000 census.

Geography
According to the United States Census Bureau, the unorganized territory has a total area of 841.9 square miles (2,180.4 km2), of which 694.2 square miles (1,798.1 km2) is land and 147.6 square miles (382.3 km2) (17.53%) is water.

Demographics
As of the census of 2000, there were 25 people, 10 households, and 8 families residing in the unorganized territory. The population density was 0.0 people per square mile (0.0/km2). There were 32 housing units at an average density of 0.0/sq mi (0.0/km2). The racial makeup of the unorganized territory was 32.00% White, 60.00% Native American, and 8.00% from two or more races.

There were 10 households, out of which 30.0% had children under the age of 18 living with them, 70.0% were married couples living together, 10.0% had a female householder with no husband present, and 20.0% were non-families. 20.0% of all households were made up of individuals, and 10.0% had someone living alone who was 65 years of age or older. The average household size was 2.50 and the average family size was 2.75.

In the unorganized territory the population was spread out, with 28.0% under the age of 18, 20.0% from 25 to 44, 28.0% from 45 to 64, and 24.0% who were 65 years of age or older. The median age was 48 years. For every 100 females, there were 78.6 males. For every 100 females age 18 and over, there were 80.0 males.

The median income for a household in the unorganized territory was $50,625, and the median income for a family was $50,625. Males had a median income of $36,250 versus $0 for females. The per capita income for the unorganized territory was $12,273. None of the population or the families were below the poverty line.

References

Populated places in Beltrami County, Minnesota
Unorganized territories in Minnesota